Kodambakkam  is a 2006 Indian Tamil-language romantic drama film directed by K.P.Jagan, and starring Nandha and Diya.

Cast
 Nandha as Sugavannan
 Diya as Dhanam
 Tejashree as Preethi
 Manivannan
 Manobala
 Ramesh Khanna
 Kalairani
 Thambi Ramaiah
 Ganja Karuppu
 Muthukaalai
 Karupuraja
 Sridhar as himself ("Oh Pappa")

Production
The producers of this movie are V.S Satheesan and K.Seveal. The film became a big hit.  He used AAA Productions to help him. The director Jaagan had already directed a movie. In addition he directed Joseph Vijay's movie Puthiya Geethai.

Soundtrack
Soundtrack was composed by Sirpy. The song "Ragasiyamanathu Kadhal" was well received. The audio launch was held at Green Park Hotel.

Reception
IndiaGlitz praised the film and its actors, writing "Hats off to Nanda for a mature performance. He looks comfortable and seems to have got under the skin of the character. His dialogue delivery has improved leaps and bounds compared to his earlier films. Dhiya, for a change, plays a de-glamorized role, while Thejashri playing a Bollywood heroine, seems to have mimed several Hindi actresses well. It is however, Manivannan and Ramesh Khanna, who are impressive. They give right emotions and succeed in not just evoking humor but also emotions at many places."

References

External links 

 

2006 films
2000s Tamil-language films
Films about filmmaking